Tan Wee Tat (born 10 August 1992) is a Malaysian male badminton player. His brothers, Tan Wee Kiong and Tan Wee Gieen also professional badminton players. In 2015, he won the men's doubles title at the Bahrain International tournament partnered with Tan Yip Jiun.

Achievements

BWF International Challenge/Series 
Men's doubles

  BWF International Challenge tournament
  BWF International Series tournament

References

External links 
 

1992 births
Living people
People from Muar
People from Johor
Malaysian sportspeople of Chinese descent
Malaysian male badminton players